Greek euro coins feature a unique design for each of the eight coins. They were all designed by Georgios Stamatopoulos with the minor coins depicting Greek ships, the middle ones portraying famous Greeks and the two large denominations showing images of Greek history and mythology. All designs feature the 12 stars of the EU, the year of imprint and a tiny symbol of the Bank of Greece. Uniquely, the value of the coins is expressed on the national side in the Greek alphabet, as well as being on the common side in the Roman alphabet. The euro cent is known as the lepto (λεπτό; plural lepta, λεπτά) in Greek.

Greece did not enter the Eurozone until 2001 and was not able to start minting coins as early as the other eleven member states, so a number of coins circulated in 2002 were not minted in Athens but in Finland (€1 and €2 – mint mark S), France (1c, 2c, 5c, 10c and 50c – mint mark F) and Spain (20c – mint mark E). The coins minted in Athens for the euro introduction in 2002, as well as all the subsequent Greek euro coins, carry only the Greek mint mark.

Greek euro design
For images of the common side and a detailed description of the coins, see euro coins.

Circulating mintage quantities
The following table shows the mintage quantity for all Greek euro coins, per denomination, per year (the numbers are represented in millions).

Greek starter kit

In 2001, the Bank of Greece issued starter kits for the introduction of the Euro.

Identifying marks

Commemorative coins

Greece has a good collection of euro commemorative coins, mainly in silver although a few coins have also been minted in gold. Their face value range from €10 to €200. This is mainly done as a legacy of an old national practice of minting gold and silver coins. These coins are not really intended to be used as means of payment, so generally they do not circulate. Here you can find some samples:

References

External links

European Central Bank – Greece

Euro coins by issuing country
Euro coins
Euro